There are three known mammalian tachykinin receptors termed NK1, NK2 and NK3. All are members of the 7 transmembrane G-protein coupled receptor family and induce the activation of phospholipase C, producing inositol triphosphate (so called Gq-coupled).

Inhibitors of NK-1, known as NK-1 receptor antagonists, can be used as antiemetic agents, such as the drug aprepitant.

Binding
The genes and receptor ligands are as follows:

(Hökfelt et al., 2001; Page, 2004; Pennefather et al., 2004; Maggi, 2000)

See also 
Substance P
G protein coupled receptors

References

External links 
 
 

G protein-coupled receptors
Molecular neuroscience